Could You Watch Your Children Burn is the second studio album by American rock band The Plot in You. The album was announced November 25, 2012, and was released on January 15, 2013. It is the band's first album with guitarist Derrick Sechrist (former clean vocalist/guitarist of A Bullet for Pretty Boy) following Anthony Thoma's departure after their debut, First Born. The first single from the album, "Premeditated", was released on December 10, 2012. The second single, "Fiction Religion", was out on December 25, 2012. On January 2, 2013, the rest of the album was uploaded onto Rise Records' YouTube page, almost two weeks prior to release, as a result of the album leaking. On the Billboard charts, the album debuted at 110 on Billboard 200, peaked at 18 on Independent Albums, and peaked at 4 on Hard Rock Albums.

Unlike First Born, the album is not a concept album, but faces similar dark themes that the band's releases typically have.

Track listing

Personnel
Credits adapted from Discogs.

The Plot in You

 Landon Tewers – vocals, guitars, bass, keyboards, engineering, mixing, mastering, production
 Cole Worden – drums

Additional personnel
 Andrew Roesch and Shawn Carrano – management
 Phill Mamula – artwork

Charts

References

2013 albums
Rise Records albums
The Plot in You albums